Tullett Brown Limited was a land banking and carbon credit fraud that was wound-up by the British Official Receiver in March 2012. After the company was wound-up, the fraud continued through associated company Foxstone Carr Ltd.

Tullett Brown had been named "Commodities Broker of the Year in Western Europe" in World News Media's World Finance Awards.

See also
Worldwide Commodity Partners

References

External links
tullettbrown.com archived on 22 March 2012.

Financial services companies established in 2009
Financial services companies based in the City of London
Fraud in England
Financial services companies disestablished in 2012